Orgetorix was a wealthy aristocrat among the Helvetii, a Celtic-speaking people residing in what is now Switzerland during the consulship of Julius Caesar of the Roman Republic.

Planned migration
In 61 BC, he convinced the Helvetians to attempt to migrate from Helvetian territory to southwestern Gaul (modern-day France). He was also party to a clandestine arrangement with Dumnorix of the Aedui and Casticus of the Sequani to seize control of their respective tribes by arms and between them rule most of Gaul. The conspiracy was denounced, Orgetorix was called to a hearing in chains before the government of the Helvetii. He arrived with a small army and was released but died mysteriously in a rumoured suicide. The Helvetians went on with their plans for migration but were defeated in 58 BC and returned by Julius Caesar. The incident was the beginning of the Gallic War in which Caesar subjugated Gaul.

Etymology
Julius Pokorny segments the name [P]orgeto-rix in which the first element contains Gallic orge "kill", related to Old Irish orcaid "kill", from the Indo-European root *per-g-, "to hit." The second element is manifestly Celtic rīx, "king:" "warrior-king", which does not imply that the owner of the name is necessarily a legal ruler. Although Orgetorix had aspirations in that direction, he was not a legal ruler.

Social position
According to Caesar's I.2 of De Bello Gallico, Orgetorix was by far the wealthiest and noblest. He made himself an ambassador on behalf of the Helvetians to the other Gallic tribes, and he gave his own daughter to Dumnorix as a bona fide gesture. Orgetorix failed in his attempt to become one of three ruling triumvirs of Gaul.

Plan for migration
The Helvetians made elaborate plans for making such a journey. According to Caesar, they spent two years sowing crops and buying beasts of burden and intended for the migration to start in the third year. The effort came by way of marital exchange and individual alliances among some of the young nobles from all three tribes.

Conspiracy
Orgetorix was intending to make an unlawful attempt in seizing control of all of Gaul, with Dumnorix and Casticus as his other triumvirs. Unknown to the Helvetians, Orgetorix was making a deal to involve the use of Helvetian soldiers to seize control of all of Gaul, instead of a mere migration. If the conspiracy had been carried out, the Aeduans, Sequanians and Helvetians, under the threesome, would have all of Gaul at their disposal.

Trial and death
Rivals among the Helvetii discovered Orgetorix's plot and moved to put him on trial, with the penalty of death by burning if he was found guilty. In assisting his efforts to avoid that fate, Orgetorix had meanwhile acquired a significant personal retinue, in addition to having called up an army of more than 10,000 men at arms in addition to their mobilized clients, followers and dependents.

Many Helvetians suspected that Orgetorix committed suicide, rather than face death by burning. According to Roman accounts, he managed to evade pleading his case, but as the magistrates forced away the crowd of persons from the fields, Orgetorix died. Nonetheless, the Helvetians continued their attempt to migrate.

See also
List of unsolved deaths
Jublains archeological site - inscriptions there give him credit as a donor in the construction of a building there

References

Sources
Dio Cassius, Roman History 38.31
Julius Caesar, Commentarii de Bello Gallico 1.2 - 1.4
Orosius, Seven Books of History Against the Pagans 6.7

1st-century BC rulers in Europe
Gaulish rulers
Helvetii
Unsolved deaths